Rasim Akhmed oglu Balayev (born 1948, in Agsu) is an Azerbaijani cinema and theatrical actor. He starred in the leading roles in more than 60 Azerbaijani films.

Early life
Rasim Balayev was born on 8 August 1948 in Agsu region of Azerbaijan. At the age of 15-16, he got involved in theater performances. Being from rural area, Rasim's family attempted to push him to choose a different career, though he never did and got enrolled in Azerbaijani Institute of Arts, from which he graduated in 1969.

Career

The actor's first film experience on big screen came with a short role in the film "Stars don't die away". Rasim Balayev's fame came after his part in 3 movies and participation in two film festivals: the 7th Soviet festival in Baku and 3rd International festival in Tashkent where he received an award for Best Actor and several proposals for main roles in future movies. Among his best performances are films Nesimi (about Nasimi), Babek, Dada Gorgud, The Scoundrel, Anecdote, and The Bat.

Personal life
In 2012, he has campaigned to stop male violence against women.

Awards
 Best Actor
 Award of Lenin's Komsomol.
Shohrat Order (1998)
Sharaf Order (2018)
Medal of Nesimi (2020)

Notes

External links
Famous People: Then and Now - Rasim Balayev in Azerbaijan International (AZER.com), Vol. 7.4 (Winter 1999), pp. 32–33.

1948 births
Living people
People from Agsu District
Azerbaijani male film actors
Azerbaijani male stage actors
Soviet male actors
People's Artists of Azerbaijan
Soviet Azerbaijani people